This is a list of edible fruits that are native to, acclimatized to, or widely cultivated in Brazil:

List of Brazilian fruits
Acanthosyris spinescens
Acrocomia aculeata
Aiphanes aculeata
Alibertia edulis
Allagoptera arenaria
Ambelania acida
Anacardium giganteum
Anacardium humile
Anacardium microcarpum (cashew)
Anacardium occidentale 
Ananas comosus (pineapple)
Annona cacans
Annona coriacea
Annona crassiflora
Annona glabra (corkwood, bobwood)
Annona montana (mountain soursop)
Annona salzmannii (annona, beach sugar apple)
Astrocaryum aculeatum
Astrocaryum vulgare
Astrocaryum
Attalea dubia
Bactris ferruginea
Bactris maraja
Bactris setosa
Bellucia grossularioides
Bellucia imperialis
Bertholletia excelsa (Brazil nut)
Bombacopsis glabra
Brosimum gaudichaudii
Butia capitata (jelly palm, pindo palm)
Butia eriospatha
Butia odorata
Butia purpurascens
Butia yatai (yataee)
Byrsonima crassifolia (golden spoon, nance)
Byrsonima verbascifolia
Campomanesia adamantium
Campomanesia aurea
Campomanesia guazumifolia
Campomanesia lineatifolia
Campomanesia neriiflora
Campomanesia phaea
Campomanesia pubescens
Campomanesia schlechtendaliana
Campomanesia sessiliflora
Campomanesia xanthocarpa var. litoralis
Campomanesia xanthocarpa
Cariocar coriaceum
Caryocar brasiliensis (souari nut)
Caryocar microcarpum
Caryocar villosum
Casearia decandra
Casearia rupestris
Cassia leiandra
Celtis iguanaea
Cereus jamacaru
Cheilochlinium cognatum
Chondodendron platyphyllum
Chrysobalanus icaco (cocoplum)
Cocos nucifera (coconut)
Cordiera elliptica
Cordiera humilis
Cordiera sessilis
Couepia bracteosa
Couepia longipendula (chicken-nut, egg nut,  nut)
Couepia subcordata
Couma utilis
Crataeva tapia
Dicella nucifera
Diospyros brasiliensis (bull's eye)
Diospyros hispida
Diospyros inconstans
Dipteryx alata
Duguetia furfuracea
Duguetia lanceolada
Endopleura uchi
Eugenia brasiliensis
Eugenia calycina (savannah cherry)
Eugenia candolleana (rainforest plum)
Eugenia copacabanensis
Eugenia dysenterica
Eugenia florida (rainforest cherry)
Eugenia involucrata (Rio Grande cherry)
Eugenia itaguahiensis
Eugenia klotzschiana
Eugenia leitonii
Eugenia luschnathiana (curuiri)
Eugenia lutescens
Eugenia multicostata
Eugenia myrcianthes
Eugenia patrisii
Eugenia pitanga
Eugenia pyriformis
Eugenia selloi
Eugenia speciosa
Eugenia stipitata (strawberry-guava, araza)
Eugenia subterminalis
Eugenia uniflora (surinam cherry, cayenne cherry)
Euterpe edulis
Euterpe oleracea (assaee)
Euterpe precatoria
Feijoa sellowiana (feijoa, guavasteen)
Fuchsia regia
Garcinia brasiliensis
Garcinia gardneriana
Garcinia macrophylla
Garcinia madruno (charichuelo)
Gaylussacia angustifolia
Gaylussacia brasiliensis
Genipa americana
Genipa infudibuliformis
Hancornia speciosa var. pubescens
Hancornia speciosa
Hymenaea courbaril (Brazilian cherry)
Hymenaea stigonocarpa
Inga cinnamomea
Inga edulis (ice-cream bean)
Inga laurina
Inga marginata
Inga sessilis
Inga vera
Inga vulpina, pink-flower inga
Jacaratia spinosa
Lecythis lanceolata
Lecythis pisonis (cream nut)
Licania salzmannii
Maclura tinctoria (dyer's mulberry)
Manilkara huberi
Manilkara salzmannii
Manilkara subsericea
Mauritia flexuosa
Maximiliana maripa
Melancium campestre
Mouriri pusa
Myrcianthes pungens
Myrciaria cuspidata
Myrciaria delicatula
Myrciaria dubia
Myrciaria floribunda (rumberry)
Myrciaria glazioviana
Myrciaria glomerata
Myrciaria guaquiea
Myrciaria pilosa
Myrciaria strigipes
Myrciaria tenella
Oenocarpus bacaba
Oenocarpus bataua
Oenocarpus distichus
Opuntia paraguayensis
Orbignya phalerata (babassu)
Pachira aquatica (nut, malabar chestnut)
Parinari obtusifolia
Passiflora alata (wild passionfruit, yellow passionfruit, melon passionfruit)
Passiflora ambigua
Passiflora amethystina
Passiflora caerulea (blue passionfruit)
Passiflora cincinnata
Passiflora coccinea
Passiflora edulis (passionfruit)
Passiflora eichleriana
Passiflora elegans
Passiflora foetida (wild water lemon, wild , love-in-a-mist, running pop)
Passiflora galbana
Passiflora giberti
Passiflora laurifolia (water lemon)
Passiflora loefgreenii
Passiflora mucronata
Passiflora nitida (bell apple)
Passiflora picturata (round passionfruit)
Passiflora quadrangularis (giant )
Passiflora serrato-digitata
Passiflora setacea
Passiflora tenuiphila
Passiflora vitifolia (grape leaf passion fruit)
Paullinia cupana
Peritassa campestris
Physalis pubescens (husk tomato, hairy groundcherry)
Pilosocereus arrabidae
Platonia insignis
Plinia cauliflora
Myrciaria coronata
Plinia edulis
Myrciaria grandifolia
Plinia inflata
Plinia martinellii
Myrciaria oblongata
Myrciaria phitrantha,
Myrciaria trunciflora
Plinia rivularis
Plinia spirito-santensis
Poraqueiba sericea
Porcelia macrocarpa
Posoqueria latifolia
Pourouma cecropiifolia (Amazon grape)
Pouteria bullata
Pouteria caimito
Pouteria gardneriana
Pouteria gardnerii
Pouteria grandiflora
Pouteria macrophylla
Pouteria pachycalyx
Pouteria ramiflora
Pouteria torta
Pouteria venosa
Pradosia brevipes
Pradosia lactescens
Psidium acutangulum
Psidium cattleyanum (cattley guava, strawberry guava)
Psidium cinereum
Psidium firmum
Psidium guajava
Psidium guajava var. minor
Psidium guineense
Psidium rufum
Psidium salutare
Quararibea cordata (sapote)
Rhamnidium elaeocarpus
Rollinia emarginata
Rollinia mucosa, 
Rollinia salicifolia
Rollinia sericea
Rollinia sylvatica
Rubus erythrocladus
Rubus rosifolius (thimbleberry)
Rubus sellowii
Salacia elliptica
Scheelea butyracea
Scheelea phalerata
Sicana odorifera (musk cucumber)
Sideroxylon obtusifolium
Solanum sessiliflorum
Spondias macrocarpa
Spondias mombin (golden apple, gully plum, coolie plum, java plum, yellow mombin)
Spondias sp.
Spondias tuberosa (Brazil plum)
Spondias venulosa
Sterculia apetala
Sterculia striata
Syagrus cearensis
Syagrus coronata
Syagrus flexuosa
Syagrus macrocarpa
Syagrus oleracea
Syagrus romanzoffiana
Syagrus schyzophylla
Syagrus vagans
Talisia esculenta
Theobroma bicolor
Theobroma cacao (cocoa)
Theobroma grandiflora
Theobroma speciosum
Theobroma subincanum
Tontellea micrantha
Vasconcella quercifolia
Vitex cymosa
Vitex montevidensis
Vitex polygama
Xymenia americana
Zizyphus joazeiro
Zizyphus mistol

List of edible fruits in Amazonia 
List of edible fruits in Amazonia (Resque 2007):

References

Bibliography 
 CAVALCANTE, Paulo B. Frutas comestíveis da Amazônia. 5. ed. Belém: Edições CEJUP, 1991; CNPq/Museu Paraense Emílio Goeldi, 1991. 279 p. (Coleção Adolpho Ducke).
 GOMES, Raimundo Pimentel (1972). Fruticultura brasileira. São Paulo: Nobel. 
 LORENZI, H.; LACERDA, M. T. C.; BACHER, L. B. (2015). Frutas no Brasil: nativas e exóticas (de consumo in natura). 2a. ed. Instituto Plantarum de Estudos da Flora, São Paulo. 704 p. [1a. ed., 2006.]
 RESQUE, Olímpia Reis. 2007. Vocabulário de Frutas Comestíveis na Amazônia. Belém: Museu Paraense Emílio Goeldi – Coordenação de Informação e Documentação.

See also
Flora Brasiliensis

Fruits
Brazil
Fruits